Cumberland is a town located in Hancock and Marion counties, Indiana, United States. The population was 5,169 at the 2010 census.

History
Cumberland was founded in the 1830s when the Cumberland Road (also known as the National Road) was extended to that point. Cumberland contained a post office from 1834 until it was discontinued in 1958. Since 1970, the Marion County portion of Cumberland has been subject to Unigov as an included town.

Geography
Cumberland is located at  (39.783528, -85.952308).

Demographics

2010 census
As of the census of 2010, there were 5,169 people, 1,972 households, and 1,422 families living in the town. The racial makeup of the town was 77.0% White, 16.8% African American, 0.6% Native American, 0.9% Asian, 0.1% Pacific Islander, 2.3% from other races, and 2.3% from two or more races. Hispanic or Latino of any race were 5.3% of the population.

There were 1,972 households, of which 36.4% had children under the age of 18 living with them, 50.3% were married couples living together, 16.6% had a female householder with no husband present, 5.2% had a male householder with no wife present, and 27.9% were non-families. 23.1% of all households were made up of individuals, and 6.8% had someone living alone who was 65 years of age or older. The average household size was 2.61 and the average family size was 3.05.

The median age in the town was 38.4 years. 27.4% of residents were under the age of 18; 7.8% were between the ages of 18 and 24; 24% were from 25 to 44; 29.3% were from 45 to 64; and 11.5% were 65 years of age or older. The gender makeup of the town was 48.1% male and 51.9% female.

2000 census
As of the census of 2000, there were 5,500 people, 2,030 households, and 1,565 families living in the town. The racial makeup of the town was 85.20% White, 10.56% African American, 0.22% Native American, 1.76% Asian, 0.04% Pacific Islander, 0.75% from other races, and 1.47% from two or more races. Hispanic or Latino of any race were 1.45% of the population.

There were 2,030 households, out of which 40.6% had children under the age of 18 living with them, 59.3% were married couples living together, 14.6% had a female householder with no husband present, and 22.9% were non-families. 19.1% of all households were made up of individuals, and 5.7% had someone living alone who was 65 years of age or older. The average household size was 2.70 and the average family size was 3.08.

In the town, the population was spread out, with 30.0% under the age of 18, 7.1% from 18 to 24, 29.9% from 25 to 44, 24.4% from 45 to 64, and 8.6% who were 65 years of age or older. The median age was 34 years. For every 100 females, there were 92.5 males. For every 100 females age 18 and over, there were 88.1 males.

The median income for a household in the town was $57,875, and the median income for a family was $61,739. Males had a median income of $48,750 versus $28,239 for females. The per capita income for the town was $24,746. About 5.0% of families and 6.6% of the population were below the poverty line, including 12.2% of those under age 18 and 1.5% of those age 65 or over.

References

External links

 Town website

Towns in Hancock County, Indiana
Towns in Marion County, Indiana
National Road
Indianapolis metropolitan area
1831 establishments in Indiana
Towns in Indiana